Notoalona is a genus of crustaceans belonging to the family Chydoridae.

The species of this genus are found in America.

Species:

Notoalona freyi 
Notoalona globulosa 
Notoalona pseudomacronyx 
Notoalona sculpta

References

Cladocera
Branchiopoda genera